The Bedford OXA was a British heavy improvised armoured car, produced during the Second World War.

Development 

It was developed by mounting an armoured body onto a Bedford OXD 30cwt (1.5 ton) truck chassis, armed with a Boys anti-tank rifle.

Its official designation was "Lorry 30cwt Anti-Tank". A total of 948 units were built in 1940–1941.

Operational use 
The vehicle was used by regular British Army units in 1940 and British Home Guard units until 1942.

See also
Armadillo armoured fighting vehicle

References

World War II armoured cars
World War II armoured fighting vehicles of the United Kingdom
OXA
Armoured cars of the United Kingdom
Military vehicles introduced from 1940 to 1944